Queen Marie Park, previously known as Coronini Park or People's Park, is the oldest park in Timișoara, located on the right side of the Bega Canal.

Location 
The park is located in Fabric district, between Johann Heinrich Pestalozzi Street, Dniester Way, Episcop Joseph Lonovici Street and 3 August 1919 Boulevard. It has an area of 45,100 m2, of which 37,400 m2 represent lawn and trees, and 5,300 m2 are alleys, the rest being other spaces.

History 
Between 1849 and 1861, part of the non aedificandi belt between Cetate and Fabric was transformed at the initiative of Johann Baptist Coronini-Cronberg, the military governor of the Voivodeship of Serbia and Banat of Temeschwar, into a park organized on a 7-jugerum (~ 2-ha) land. It was the first landscaping on a part of the so-called esplanade that surrounded the fortress, where no interventions had been allowed until then. In 1857, the First Savings House of Timișoara (Erste Temeswarer Sparkassa) contributed 200 forints to the realization of the initial project. Coronini Park, as it would be called until 1867, was inaugurated in 1859. It was taken over by the city in 1868, and in 1910 it was surrounded by an iron fence with stone pillars. After the Austro-Hungarian Compromise of 1867, the park was named Városliget, Hungarian for "City Park". Later, however, through urbanization and the construction of roads and bridges, three parks were separated from the former Városliget: the Roses Park, the Justice Park and the Cathedral Park. In 1918 it was once again renamed Queen Marie Park, in honor of Marie of Romania. During communism, the park was called the Youth Park, and then the People's Park.

In the park is the former Apollo Cinema, which was originally built in 1909 by architect Josef Ecker, Jr. and rebuilt in 1955 by architect Paul Schuster.

References 

Parks in Timișoara